Perez Francisco Sartore Dos Santos, known as Francisco Santore (born 6 July 1995) is a Brazilian footballer who plays as a forward for Italian club Fiorenzuola. He also holds Italian citizenship.

Club career
Sartore started his Italian career in the youth teams of Genoa, before he was loaned to Lega Pro side Mantova for the 2014–15 season. He made his professional debut on 30 August 2014 against Alessandria, playing 59 minutes as a member of starting team. He left Genoa on the summer of 2015, signing to fellow third tier Lucchese. He spent the 2016–17 and 2017–18 seasons at Matera, before he signed to Alessandria.

On 9 October 2020 he joined Bisceglie.

On 6 September 2021, he signed with Turris.

On 11 January 2022, he moved to Fiorenzuola.

References

Sources
 
 
 

1995 births
Living people
Sportspeople from Santos, São Paulo
Association football forwards
Brazilian people of Italian descent
Brazilian footballers
Genoa C.F.C. players
Mantova 1911 players
S.S.D. Lucchese 1905 players
Matera Calcio players
U.S. Alessandria Calcio 1912 players
A.S. Bisceglie Calcio 1913 players
S.S. Turris Calcio players
U.S. Fiorenzuola 1922 S.S. players
Brazilian expatriate footballers
Brazilian expatriate sportspeople in Italy
Expatriate footballers in Italy
Serie C players